J. Wood Wilson House, also known as the Wilson-Vaughan House and Hostess House, is a historic home located at Marion, Grant County, Indiana.  It was built in 1912, and is a -story, rectangular, Colonial Revival / Georgian Revival style brick dwelling. The front facade features a projecting portico with Ionic order columns and balcony with a decorative iron railing.  It was designed by noted African-American architect Samuel Plato (1882–1957).

It was listed on the National Register of Historic Places in 1988.

References

Marion, Indiana
Houses on the National Register of Historic Places in Indiana
Colonial Revival architecture in Indiana
Georgian Revival architecture in Indiana
Houses completed in 1912
Buildings and structures in Grant County, Indiana
National Register of Historic Places in Grant County, Indiana
1912 establishments in Indiana